The 2018 Royal Rumble was the 31st annual Royal Rumble professional wrestling pay-per-view and livestreaming event produced by WWE. It was held for wrestlers from the promotion's Raw and SmackDown brand divisions. The event took place on January 28, 2018, at the Wells Fargo Center in Philadelphia, Pennsylvania. It was the first Royal Rumble event to include a women's Royal Rumble match, and consequently, two Royal Rumble matches, which is now standard for the event.

Traditionally, the Royal Rumble match winner receives a world championship match at that year's WrestleMania. With the introduction of a women's Royal Rumble match, two Royal Rumble matches were contested on the card with the winners of each receiving a choice of which championship to challenge for at WrestleMania 34. The men could choose to challenge for either Raw's Universal Championship or SmackDown's WWE Championship, while the women had the choice between the Raw Women's Championship and the SmackDown Women's Championship.

In total, nine matches were contested at the event, including three on the Kickoff pre-show. In the main event, Raw's Asuka won the first-ever women's Royal Rumble match by last eliminating SmackDown's Nikki Bella. This was also the second women's match to main event a WWE pay-per-view, and the first to main event one of WWE's "Big Four" pay-per-views. The men's Royal Rumble match was won by SmackDown's Shinsuke Nakamura, who last eliminated Raw's Roman Reigns. Other prominent matches included Brock Lesnar retaining the Universal Championship in a triple threat match against Braun Strowman and Kane, and AJ Styles retained the WWE Championship against Kevin Owens and Sami Zayn in a handicap match. The event was also notable for the surprise debut of former UFC mixed martial artist Ronda Rousey following the women's Rumble match, officially confirming that she had signed full-time with WWE.

Production

Background
The Royal Rumble is an annual gimmick pay-per-view (PPV) and WWE Network event, produced every January by WWE since 1988. It is one of the promotion's original four pay-per-views, along with WrestleMania, SummerSlam, and Survivor Series, dubbed the "Big Four". It is named after the Royal Rumble match, a modified battle royal in which the participants enter at timed intervals instead of all beginning in the ring at the same time. The 2018 event was the 31st event in the Royal Rumble chronology and was scheduled to be held on January 28, 2018, at the Wells Fargo Center in Philadelphia, Pennsylvania. It featured wrestlers from the Raw and SmackDown brands with some NXT wrestlers and WWE veterans appearing in the Royal Rumble matches.

The Royal Rumble match generally features 30 wrestlers and the winner traditionally earns a world championship match at that year's WrestleMania. It was originally only contested by male wrestlers. However, for 2018, Raw Commissioner Stephanie McMahon scheduled the first-ever women's Royal Rumble match to be held at the 2018 Royal Rumble, which consequently made the 2018 event the first to include two Rumble matches, which is now standard. As a result, the winners of each match received a choice of which championship to challenge for at WrestleMania 34. The men could choose to challenge for either Raw's Universal Championship or SmackDown's WWE Championship, while the women had the choice between the Raw Women's Championship and the SmackDown Women's Championship.

Storylines
The card consisted of nine matches, including three on the Kickoff pre-show. The matches resulted from scripted storylines, where wrestlers portrayed heroes, villains, or less distinguishable characters in scripted events that built tension and culminated in a wrestling match or series of matches, with results predetermined by WWE's writers on the Raw and SmackDown brands. Storylines were produced on WWE's weekly television shows, Monday Night Raw, SmackDown Live, and 205 Live, the latter of which is cruiserweight-exclusive.

On the October 16, 2017, episode of Raw, Kane returned from a ten-month hiatus and helped Braun Strowman to defeat Roman Reigns in a steel cage match. Kane was then added to Strowman's team at TLC: Tables, Ladders & Chairs in the 5-on-3 handicap Tables, Ladders, and Chairs match. During the match, Kane accidentally hit Strowman with a chair, which caused tension between the two. Later on in the match, Kane turned on Strowman and crushed him in the back of a garbage truck; their team ultimately lost. The two then feuded over the next several weeks, leading to a match on the December 11 episode to determine the number one contender against Brock Lesnar for the Universal Championship at the Royal Rumble, but the match ended in a double countout. Raw General Manager Kurt Angle then decided that Lesnar would defend the title against both Kane and Strowman in a triple threat match at the event. On the January 8 episode, Kane attacked Lesnar from behind, followed by an attack from Strowman. After laying Kane and Lesnar out backstage, Strowman knocked over a lighting rig and crushed both. Lesnar was taken to a medical facility while Kane refused medical attention. Due to his actions, Strowman was removed from the triple threat match and fired by Angle. Strowman went on a rampage backstage, including destroying Angle's office and flipping over a tractor. Before he could do anymore damage, Raw Commissioner Stephanie McMahon rehired Strowman, putting him back into the Universal Championship match at the Royal Rumble.

After Survivor Series, several women from NXT were promoted to the main rosters of both Raw and SmackDown. On the November 20, 2017, episode of Raw, Paige, who had been out with an injury since June 2016, returned along with the debuts of NXT's Mandy Rose and Sonya Deville, forming the heel group Absolution, while similarly on the November 21 episode of SmackDown, NXT's Ruby Riott, Liv Morgan, and Sarah Logan debuted and formed the heel group The Riott Squad. On the December 18, 2017, episode of Raw, with a larger roster of women on the main rosters, Raw Commissioner Stephanie McMahon scheduled the first-ever women's Royal Rumble match for the 2018 Royal Rumble, with the winner receiving a match at WrestleMania 34 for the top championship of their choice: Raw's Women's Championship or SmackDown's Women's Championship. Both brands' respective commissioners and general managers agreed that the women's match would have all of the same rules as the men's match, including having 30 participants. Stephanie was announced to join the commentary team for the women's match, and television host Maria Menounos was announced to be the special guest ring announcer.

At Clash of Champions, SmackDown's Commissioner Shane McMahon and General Manager Daniel Bryan both refereed a tag team match pitting Kevin Owens and Sami Zayn against Randy Orton and Shinsuke Nakamura, where Owens and Zayn would have been fired from WWE had they lost. During the match, there was controversy between Shane and Bryan, which resulted in Bryan giving a fast count for Owens and Zayn to win. Tensions between Shane and Bryan continued over the next couple of weeks, culminating on the final SmackDown of 2017, when Bryan scheduled Owens to face WWE Champion AJ Styles in a non-title match in the main event, much to the disapproval of Shane, who felt that Owens should not be in the main event, or facing the WWE Champion. That match ended when Zayn interfered, allowing Owens to win. The next week, Zayn would also defeat Styles in a non-title match after interference from Owens. Enraged at back-to-back losses, Styles stated they might as well schedule him in a handicap match against Owens and Zayn, which Bryan took literally and scheduled for the Royal Rumble where Styles would also defend the WWE Championship against both men. On the January 9 episode of SmackDown, Styles said that although it was unfair, he was confident that he would win; Owens and Zayn interrupted and claimed that they would become the first-ever co-WWE Champions. On the final SmackDown before the Royal Rumble, Styles faced Owens and Zayn in back-to-back matches where Shane threatened that if one were to interfere in the other's match, that person would be fired. Styles managed to defeat Owens in the first match by submission, however, he would lose to Zayn in the second match.

On the December 18, 2017, episode of Raw, Seth Rollins' tag team partner Dean Ambrose was injured by Samoa Joe. The following week, despite both wanting to take on Joe to avenge Ambrose, Raw General Manager Kurt Angle instead had his (storyline) son, Jason Jordan, and Rollins team up to face Cesaro and Sheamus for the Raw Tag Team Championship; Jordan and Rollins defeated Cesaro and Sheamus to win the championship. After the former champions confronted Angle about their contractual rematch, Angle scheduled it for the Royal Rumble. On the January 15 episode, Jordan caused a distraction, allowing Titus Worldwide (Apollo Crews and Titus O'Neil) to again defeat Cesaro and Sheamus in a rematch from the previous week, which Rollins disapproved of as he did not like Jordan acting on his own. Cesaro and Sheamus would try and return the favor during Rollins' match against Finn Bálor, but it backfired, resulting in Rollins winning, and Cesaro and Sheamus brawling with Bálor Club members, Luke Gallows and Karl Anderson, at ringside. On Raw 25 the next week, Jordan and Rollins were the guests on Christian's The Peep Show, which Cesaro and Sheamus interrupted and the two teams brawled where Rollins accidentally hit Jordan with a knee attack that was intended for Cesaro.

At Clash of Champions, The Usos (Jey and Jimmy Uso) retained the SmackDown Tag Team Championship in a fatal-four-way match against Rusev and Aiden English, The New Day's Big E and Xavier Woods, and Chad Gable and Shelton Benjamin. On the following episode of SmackDown, Gable and Benjamin defeated The Usos in a non-title match, and they were awarded with a championship match on the first SmackDown of 2018, where they defeated The Usos to initially win the titles after pinning Jimmy Uso; however, Jimmy was not the legal man, and thus the match was restarted and The Usos retained their championship. The following week, Gable and Benjamin confronted SmackDown General Manager Daniel Bryan over the incident. After questioning if they should have to defeat The Usos twice in the same night, Bryan decided that at the Royal Rumble, The Usos would defend the SmackDown Tag Team Championship against Gable and Benjamin in a two-out-of-three-falls match.

On January 26, three matches were announced for the Royal Rumble Kickoff pre-show. For SmackDown, it was announced that United States Champion Bobby Roode would have an open challenge for the title. Two tag team matches were scheduled for Raw: a rematch between Luke Gallows and Karl Anderson and The Revival (Dash Wilder and Scott Dawson) from Raw 25, and a six-man tag team match for the cruiserweight division with Kalisto, Gran Metalik, and Lince Dorado against Drew Gulak, TJP, and Gentleman Jack Gallagher.

Cancellations
Two other matches had been promoted for the event, but were later removed.

The first was the tournament final for SmackDown's then-vacant United States Championship. Originally scheduled for the PPV, the finals were instead contested on the January 16 episode of SmackDown, where Bobby Roode defeated Jinder Mahal to win the title.

The second was a championship match for the Raw brand where WWE Cruiserweight Champion Enzo Amore was scheduled to defend the title against Cedric Alexander. However, after Amore was suspended from WWE on January 22 due to allegations of sexual harassment and sexual assault, the match was canceled. Amore was released the next day and the title was vacated.

Event

Pre-show
Three matches were contested during the Royal Rumble Kickoff pre-show:

In the first match - featuring the cruiserweight division - Kalisto, Gran Metalik, and Lince Dorado faced TJP, Gentleman Jack Gallagher, and Drew Gulak in a six-man tag team match. Kalisto performed a "Salida Del Sol" on TJP to score the win.

Next, also from Raw, The Revival (Dash Wilder and Scott Dawson) faced Luke Gallows and Karl Anderson. Dawson performed a chop block on Anderson to score the win.

Finally, SmackDown's United States Champion Bobby Roode issued an open challenge, which was answered by fellow SmackDown wrestler Mojo Rawley. Roode performed a "Glorious DDT" on Rawley to score the pinfall and retain the title.

Preliminary matches
The actual pay-per-view opened with AJ Styles defending the WWE Championship against Kevin Owens and Sami Zayn in a handicap match. In the end, Styles threw Zayn out of the ring and immediately Owens performed a superkick on Styles. Owens - who was not the legal man - attempted a pop-up powerbomb on Styles, who countered into a roll up to retain the title. In a backstage segment, Owens and Zayn confronted SmackDown Commissioner Shane McMahon about the incident, however, after questioning if he saw what had happened, Shane smiled, replied "Yep", and walked off.

Next, The Usos (Jey and Jimmy Uso) defended the SmackDown Tag Team Championship against Chad Gable and Shelton Benjamin in a 2-out-of-3-falls match. Jimmy and Jey performed a double superkick on Gable, who was kneeling, to score the first fall. Jey then pinned Benjamin with a small package to score the second fall to retain the title.

After that, the 30-man Royal Rumble match for a world championship match at WrestleMania 34 was contested. Rusev and Finn Bálor began the match as the first and second entrants, respectively. Baron Corbin (#4) eliminated Rhyno (#3), but was eliminated by Bálor. Corbin attacked Bálor, Rusev, and Heath Slater (#5), who just made his entrance. NXT Champion Andrade "Cien" Almas was a surprise entrant at #7. Tye Dillinger was scheduled to be #10, but was attacked backstage by Kevin Owens and Sami Zayn, resulting in Zayn taking Dillinger's spot. Shinsuke Nakamura entered at #14 and eliminated Zayn. John Cena entered at #20 and eliminated Elias (#6) and The Hurricane (a surprise entrant at #21). NXT's Adam Cole, another surprise entrant, entered at #23. Randy Orton (#24) performed an "RKO" on Almas and eliminated him after a near 30-minute run. Rey Mysterio, another surprise entrant, entered at #27 and eliminated Cole. Roman Reigns entered at #28 and eliminated Titus O'Neil (#25). Reigns and Seth Rollins (#18) teamed up and performed a powerbomb on The Miz (#26) over the top rope to eliminate him, after which, Reigns immediately eliminated Rollins. Dolph Ziggler, making his return after vacating the United States Championship, entered at #30 and eliminated Goldust (#29), but was eliminated by Bálor. Reigns performed a superman punch on Orton and eliminated Orton. Mysterio performed a "619" on Cena and Reigns, but was eliminated by Bálor. Bálor, Nakamura, Cena, and Reigns were the final four. Cena eliminated Bálor (who lasted nearly an hour) and immediately afterwards fought with Nakamura, who performed a "Kinshasa" on Cena to eliminate him. Nakamura attacked Reigns and attempted a "Kinshasa", however, Reigns countered into a spear. As Reigns attempted to eliminate Nakamura, Nakamura countered, performed a "Kinshasa" on Reigns and then eliminated Reigns to win the match. Afterward, Renee Young interviewed Nakamura and asked which world championship he wanted to challenge for at WrestleMania 34. He called out WWE Champion AJ Styles, thus choosing the WWE Championship and staying on SmackDown.

Next, Seth Rollins and Jason Jordan defended the Raw Tag Team Championship against Cesaro and Sheamus. During the match, Jordan sustained a head injury (after being thrown into the ring post by Cesaro), rendering him unable to compete. In the end, Sheamus and Cesaro performed a "White Noise"/diving neckbreaker combination on Rollins to win the title for a record-setting fourth time as a team, and a record-setting fifth time for Cesaro individually.

In the fifth match, Brock Lesnar defended the Universal Championship against Braun Strowman and Kane in a triple threat match. Lesnar drove Kane into a corner, but Strowman caught Lesnar and drove him into the opposite corner. Strowman attacked Lesnar with a running dropkick and performed a clothesline on Kane. As Lesnar attempted an "F-5" on Strowman, Kane performed a chokeslam on Lesnar. Before he could cover him, Strowman attacked Kane, drove him back into his corner, and performed 2 headbutts on him. As Kane attempted a chokeslam on Strowman, Lesnar struck Kane with a chair, only for Strowman to punch the chair out of Lesnar's hand, perform a clothesline on him, and throw him and Kane outside the ring. At ringside, Strowman drove Lesnar into the barricade and struck Kane with the steel steps. Strowman retrieved 2 tables under the ring and brought Kane back in the ring. Strowman positioned both tables at 2 opposite corners, with one standing up and the other next to the turnbuckles. As Kane attempted a chokeslam on Strowman, the latter countered into his own chokeslam on Kane. However, Lesnar broke up the pinfall at a two count and performed three German suplexes on Strowman. Strowman performed a running powerslam on Lesnar through the standing table, only for Kane to break up the pinfall at a two count. As Strowman attempted another powerslam on Kane through the other table, the latter then drove Strowman through it instead, and performed a chokeslam on him, with Lesnar breaking up the pinfall at a two count. Lesnar performed an "F-5" on Kane, but before he could cover him, Strowman performed a German suplex on Lesnar, who rolled outside the ring. Once again at ringside, Strowman drove Lesnar into the barricade. Lesnar then performed an "F-5" on Strowman through an announce table and overturned another announce table on top of Strowman (in a reversal of what happened last year at Summerslam; though where Lesnar had to be stretchered out and then returned, Strowman stood back up in defiance). As Kane attempted a chokeslam on Lesnar, the latter countered and then performed another "F-5" on Kane through a third announce table. Strowman recovered and performed a kick to Lesnar, who fell head-first into the steel steps. Back in the ring, Strowman performed two running powerslams on Lesnar, but Kane returned and struck Strowman with a chair, driving him outside the ring. As Kane attempted a Tombstone piledriver on Lesnar, the latter shoved Kane into Strowman (who was about to return to the ring), knocking him off the ring apron. Lesnar performed an "F-5" on Kane onto the chair and pinned him to retain the title. After the match, an enraged Strowman returned to the ring and yelled at Lesnar that he did not beat and pin him.

Main event 

The main event was the first-ever 30-woman Royal Rumble match for a women's championship match at WrestleMania 34. Sasha Banks and Becky Lynch were the first and second entrants, respectively. There were numerous surprise entrants throughout the match - including Hall of Famers Lita, Jacqueline, Beth Phoenix, and Trish Stratus; NXT wrestlers Kairi Sane and NXT Women's Champion Ember Moon; and past stars Torrie Wilson, Molly Holly, Michelle McCool (who scored the most eliminations at 5), Vickie Guerrero, and Kelly Kelly. SmackDown's Nikki Bella, who had been on hiatus since WrestleMania 33, and Brie Bella were also unannounced entrants. Banks, Asuka (#25), Nikki, and Brie were the final four. Banks, Nikki, and Brie attacked Asuka, after which, Nikki and Brie eliminated Banks (who lasted the longest at nearly 55 minutes). Asuka attacked Nikki and Brie, but Nikki performed a "Rack Attack 2.0" on Asuka and then eliminated Brie. After a back-and-forth exchange, Asuka eliminated Nikki to win the match and earn a women's championship match at WrestleMania 34. After the match, Raw Women's Champion Alexa Bliss and SmackDown Women's Champion Charlotte Flair entered the ring. Before Asuka could make her decision for which title she wanted to challenge for, they were interrupted by the surprise appearance of former UFC star Ronda Rousey, officially confirming she had signed full-time with WWE. Rousey pointed to the WrestleMania sign and offered a handshake to Asuka, who refused. Rousey then shook hands with Raw Commissioner Stephanie McMahon as the event ended. The jacket which Rousey wore during this appearance belonged to lifelong idol Roddy Piper, whose son let her borrow it.

Aftermath

Raw
On Raw the following night, Raw Commissioner Stephanie McMahon convinced Asuka to wait until after Elimination Chamber to make her decision, as Raw Women's Champion Alexa Bliss was scheduled to defend her title in the first-ever women's Elimination Chamber match, and the result may affect Asuka's decision. Asuka was then confronted by Sasha Banks, who spent the longest time in the Royal Rumble match, and Banks challenged Asuka to a match that Asuka won. Banks, along with Bayley, Mandy Rose, Mickie James, and Sonya Deville were announced as the other competitors in the Elimination Chamber match. Nia Jax was also scheduled to face Asuka at Elimination Chamber where if she were to win, she would be added to the Asuka's championship match at WrestleMania. On the February 12 episode of Raw, it was announced that Ronda Rousey would sign her Raw contract at Elimination Chamber. At SmackDown's Fastlane pay-per-view, Asuka appeared and decided to challenge Charlotte Flair for the SmackDown Women's Championship at WrestleMania.

Since Shinsuke Nakamura decided to stay on SmackDown to challenge for the WWE Championship at WrestleMania 34, Raw General Manager Kurt Angle scheduled a number one contender's Elimination Chamber match at the namesake event to determine who would face Brock Lesnar for the Universal Championship at WrestleMania. Six qualification matches were scheduled over the next couple of weeks. Braun Strowman and Kane battled in a last man standing match, which Strowman won to qualify. After the match, Kane was taken to a local hospital. Elias, John Cena, Roman Reigns, Intercontinental Champion The Miz, Finn Bálor, and Seth Rollins also qualified, marking the first seven-man Elimination Chamber match.

New Raw Tag Team Champions Cesaro and Sheamus defended their titles against Titus Worldwide (Apollo Crews and Titus O'Neil), as they had beaten Cesaro and Sheamus two weeks in a row prior to the Royal Rumble; Cesaro and Sheamus retained. The following week, Jason Jordan and Seth Rollins were scheduled to have their contractual rematch, but after Jordan was deemed unable to compete, he was replaced by Roman Reigns. Jordan, however, accidentally caused them to be disqualified.

SmackDown

On the following episode of SmackDown, Shinsuke Nakamura celebrated his win at the Royal Rumble, and said he would become the new WWE Champion at WrestleMania 34. He was interrupted by Kevin Owens and Sami Zayn, who said that they should be the co-WWE Champions, but the referee failed at his job at the Royal Rumble. WWE Champion AJ Styles came out and said that Owens and Zayn could complain all they want, but there would be a dream match at WrestleMania between him and Nakamura. Styles then suggested to have a dream team that night with him and Nakamura facing Owens and Zayn, which SmackDown General Manager Daniel Bryan made official for later that night in which Styles and Nakamura won. During the match, there were tensions between Owens and Zayn as Bryan had also scheduled them to face each other the following week to determine the number one contender for the WWE Championship at Fastlane. The championship match at Fastlane then became a fatal five-way also involving Baron Corbin and Dolph Ziggler and finally a six-pack challenge when John Cena qualified by defeating Styles in a non-title match.

In the mid-card, a fatal four-way match between Kofi Kingston of The New Day, Jinder Mahal, Zack Ryder, and Rusev occurred to determine the number one contender against Bobby Roode for the United States Championship, which was won by Rusev, who was unsuccessful in winning the title. Also following the Royal Rumble, SmackDown General Manager Daniel Bryan revealed the first-ever "SmackDown Top Ten List" as voted on by the SmackDown roster to see who the wrestlers thought should get a title opportunity. This played into a storyline between Roode, who ranked 5th, Randy Orton, who ranked 9th, and Jinder Mahal, who did not rank, resulting in SmackDown Commissioner Shane McMahon scheduling Roode to defend the U.S. Championship against Orton at Fastlane.

In the women's division, SmackDown Women's Champion Charlotte Flair praised the first-ever women's Royal Rumble match, but wished that she could have competed in it. She addressed Ronda Rousey's debut and questioned who her WrestleMania 34 opponent would be. The Riott Squad interrupted and Ruby Riott said Flair would not make it to WrestleMania and they attacked Flair. Carmella came out to try and cash-in her Money in the Bank briefcase on Flair, but was not able to as she accidentally knocked out the referee before the bell could ring. After feuding with The Riott Squad over the next few weeks, Flair was scheduled to defend her title against Riott at Fastlane.

205 Live
On 205 Live, Drake Maverick (formerly known as Rockstar Spud in Impact Wrestling) was appointed as the 205 Live General Manager. Maverick announced that there would be a 16-man single elimination tournament to crown a new WWE Cruiserweight Champion, with the finals to occur at WrestleMania 34.

Results

Men's Royal Rumble match entrances and eliminations

Brand
 – Raw
 – SmackDown
 – NXT
 - Unbranded 
 – Winner

(*) - Tye Dillinger was announced as the #10 entrant, but was attacked backstage by Kevin Owens and Sami Zayn, resulting in Zayn taking his spot.
(**) - Heath Slater spent significant time outside of the ring before officially entering the Rumble, due to being attacked by Baron Corbin and other wrestlers.
(***) - WWE.com's official website lists Sheamus' time to be 20 seconds, but they have otherwise stated 2 seconds
(****) - Matt Hardy eliminated himself at the same time he eliminated Bray Wyatt.

Women's Royal Rumble match entrances and eliminations
Brand

 – Raw
 – SmackDown
 – NXT
 - Unbranded
 – Hall of Famer (HOF)
 – Winner

(*) - Kairi Sane was a last minute replacement for Alicia Fox, who was originally scheduled to participate in the match, but got injured just prior to the event.

References

External links
 

2018
2018 WWE Network events
Events in Philadelphia
2018 in Pennsylvania
Professional wrestling in Philadelphia
2018 WWE pay-per-view events
January 2018 events in the United States